Middleberg may refer to:
 Middleberg, Oklahoma

See also
 Middelberg
 Middleburg (disambiguation)
 Middelburg (disambiguation)